David Jeffrey Bednar (born October 10, 1994) is an American professional baseball pitcher for the Pittsburgh Pirates of Major League Baseball (MLB). He previously played in MLB for the San Diego Padres.

Amateur career
Bednar attended Mars Area High School in Mars, Pennsylvania. Undrafted out of high school, Bednar attended Lafayette College in Easton, Pennsylvania, where he played college baseball for the Leopards.

Professional career

San Diego Padres
Bednar was drafted by the San Diego Padres in the 35th round, with the 1,044th overall selection, of the 2016 MLB draft. He split the 2016 season between the Tri-City Dust Devils and the Fort Wayne TinCaps, combining to go 4–4 with a 2.32 ERA in 31 innings. He split the 2017 season between Fort Wayne and the Lake Elsinore Storm, going a combined 1–4 with a 2.64 ERA in 60 innings. He spent the 2018 season in Lake Elsinore, going 2–4 with a 2.73 ERA in 69 innings. Bednar played for the San Antonio Missions in the 2018 Texas League playoffs. In 2019, he spent the minor league season with the Amarillo Sod Poodles, going 2–5 with a 2.95 ERA in 58 innings.

On September 1, 2019, the Padres selected Bednar's contract and promoted him to the major leagues. He made his major league debut that day versus the San Francisco Giants, pitching a scoreless inning in relief. Bednar produced a 0–2 record with a 6.55 ERA and 14 strikeouts over 11 innings in 2019. In 2020 for San Diego, Bednar recorded a 7.11 ERA with 5 strikeouts in 6.1 innings of work.

Pittsburgh Pirates
On January 19, 2021, Bednar was traded to the Pittsburgh Pirates as part of a three-team trade that also sent Omar Cruz, Drake Fellows, Hudson Head and Endy Rodríguez to the Pirates, Joe Musgrove to the Padres and Joey Lucchesi to the New York Mets. In his first full season in the major leagues, Bednar was 3–1 with a 2.23 ERA and 77 strikeouts in 61 appearances.  Bednar received a single vote in National League Rookie of the Year voting, tying him for eighth place with Vladimir Gutiérrez.

Personal life
Bednar's younger brother, Will, is a pitcher in the San Francisco Giants organization. His nickname, "The Renegade", is in homage to the Styx song of the same name; commonly used as a pump-up song for his hometown Pittsburgh Steelers.

References

External links

1994 births
Living people
Baseball players from Pittsburgh
Major League Baseball pitchers
San Diego Padres players
Pittsburgh Pirates players
National League All-Stars
Lafayette Leopards baseball players
Tri-City Dust Devils players
Fort Wayne TinCaps players
Lake Elsinore Storm players
San Antonio Missions players
Amarillo Sod Poodles players
Peoria Javelinas players
2023 World Baseball Classic players